Risplith is a village in the civil parish of Sawley, in the Harrogate district of North Yorkshire, England. The name is believed to derive from Old Norse of slope overgrown with brushwood.

The hamlet was previously in the Wapentake of Claro. An ice-cream manufacturer works in the village with a shop and restaurant where passers-by can stop and watch ice-cream being made. In 2018, it was named as one of Britain's best ice-cream parlours by The Daily Telegraph.

Transport to Ripon and Harrogate is provided by the three times daily bus service (each way).

References

External links

Villages in North Yorkshire